Mohen Leo is a visual effects supervisor.

Leo has worked on films since 1997, he received a nomination at the 89th Academy Awards in the category of Best Visual Effects. This was for the film Rogue One: A Star Wars Story. His nomination was shared with Neil Corbould, Hal Hickel and John Knoll.

References

External links

Living people
Year of birth missing (living people)
Place of birth missing (living people)
Visual effects supervisors